This is a list of public holidays on the Isle of Man.

References

Man, Isle of
Events in the Isle of Man
Society of the Isle of Man
Man, Isle of